

Geography 
Ennsdorf lies on the Enns River.

History
In the Roman empire it was part of the region Noricum. In the year 1244 it was first mentioned in records. All times it was strongly bound to the city of Enns, although it belonged until 1779 to St. Valentin.

On May 5, 1945, SS units replaced approx. 800 soldiers based in Ennsdorf. On May 7, negotiations to surrender failed. On May 8, 1945, Major General Stanley Eric Reinhart expected 15,000 to 16,000 German PWs to cross the bridge at ENNSDORF to surrender. On May 10, Soviet soldiers took over.

Politics
The distribution of 21 mandates in the town council is: SPÖ 13, ÖVP 6, BL-EW 1, FPÖ 1.

References

Cities and towns in Amstetten District